The city of Chicago, Illinois held a nonpartisan mayoral election on Tuesday, February 22, 2011. Incumbent Mayor Richard Michael Daley, a member of the Democratic Party who had been in office since 1989, did not seek a seventh term as mayor. This was the first election since 1947 in which an incumbent mayor of Chicago did not seek reelection.

Candidates needed to collect 12,500 petition signatures by November 22, 2010 to qualify for a place on the ballot. April 5, 2011 was scheduled to be a runoff election date if no candidate received an absolute majority.

Rahm Emanuel won the race for mayor with more than 55% of the vote. He was inaugurated on May 16, 2011.

The election saw what was, at the time, the most candidates running on the ballot 
of any Chicago mayoral election since 1919. This would be surpassed by the 2019 Chicago mayoral election.

Candidates
Nominating petitions were filed for 20 candidates in November 2010. In the initial review of the petitions by the Chicago Board of Election Commissioners on December 6, 2010, three candidates, Ryan Graves, M. Tricia Lee, and Jay Stone, were removed from the ballot for submitting insufficient numbers of signatures or duplicate signatures, although they had the right to seek reconsideration of the decision. Rob Halpin, businessman and tenant of Rahm Emanuel, withdrew from the election on the same day. Tom Hanson was removed by the Board of Election Commissioners on December 13, but filed a complaint in Circuit County Court Chancery division seeking reversal of the Board's decision, for being contrary to Illinois Election Code, Section 10–8, but was not reinstated. Former U.S. Senator from Illinois Roland Burris withdrew from the race on December 17, 2010. State Senator James Meeks ended his bid on December 23, 2010, the deadline for candidates to not appear on the ballot.

Danny K. Davis, U.S. Representative from Illinois's 7th district, withdrew on December 31, 2010, to support Carol Moseley Braun, in an attempt to unite voters behind a single major African American candidate.

Assemblies of God congregation leader Wilfredo De Jesús dropped out of the race on January 7, 2011, and endorsed Gery Chico.

Real estate broker John Hu was removed from the ballot by the Chicago Board of Election Commissioners on December 29, 2010. On January 11, 2011, the Chicago Board of Election Commissioners removed three additional candidates whose candidacies were challenged and finalized the election ballot of six candidates.

On ballot
Six candidates appeared on the February 22 ballot:

{| class="wikitable sortable" style="text-align:center"
|-
!scope="col"| Candidate
!scope="col"| Experience
!scope="col"| Announced
!scope="col" class="unsortable"|
|-
!scope="row"| 
| President of the Chicago Park District Board of Commissioners (2007–2010)President of the Chicago Board of Education (1995–2001)former Chief of Staff to Mayor Richard M. Daleyformer Chairman of the City Colleges of Chicago
|
| 
|-
!scope="row"| 
|City Clerk of Chicago since 2006Illinois state senator from the 2nd district (1987–2006)
|September 2010
|
|-
!scope="row"| 
| White House Chief of Staff (2009–2010)U.S. Congressman from Illinois' 5th district (2003–2009)Senior Advisor to the President of the United States (1993–1998) White House Director of Political Affairs (1993)
|
| 
|-
!scope="row"| 
| United States Ambassador to New Zealand (1999–2001) and to Samoa (2000–2001)United States Senator from Illinois (1993–1999)Cook County Recorder of Deeds (1988–1992)Member of the Illinois House of Representatives (1979–1988)
|
| 
|-
!scope="row"| 
| Non-profit administrator and activist
|
| 
|-
!scope="row"| William "Dock" Walls
| former aide to Mayor Harold Washingtoncommunity activist, businessman, and perennial candidate'|
| 
|}

Write-in candidates
D’Anne E. Burley
Alfredo Castillo
 Alex George (AG) 
Anthony Brent Gray (Tony) 
Tommy Hanson
John C. Hawkins 
John Hu 
Peter Dale Kauss, Sr 
“Fredrick” “Frederick” “Fred” “F.” K. White

Withdrew
The following individuals withdrew their candidacies
Roland Burris, former United States Senator, candidate for mayor in 1995
Danny K. Davis, congressman, candidate for mayor in 1999
Rob Halpin 
Wilfredo De Jesús, Assemblies of God congregation leader
James Meeks, state senator

Nominations invalid
The following candidates had their nominations deemed invalid by the Chicago Board of Elections, and thus were denied inclusion on the ballot:
Tyrone Carter
Ryan Graves
Rob Hanson
John Hu subsequently ran as write-inFenton C. Patterson
M. Tricia Lee
Howard Ray
Jay Stone
Fredrick K. White subsequently ran as write-inDeclined
Edward M. Burke, alderman, candidate for mayor in 1989
Richard M. Daley, incumbent mayor
Tom Dart, Cook County Sheriff
Robert Fioretti, alderman
Manuel Flores, Illinois Commerce Commission Chairman, former alderman
Luis Gutiérrez, congressman
James Houlihan, Cook County Assessor
Jesse Jackson Jr., congressman
Sandi Jackson, alderman
Terry Peterson, Chicago Transit Authority chairman, former CEO of Chicago Housing Authority, former alderman
Kwame Raoul, member of the Illinois Senate
Larry Rogers, Jr., commissioner of the Cook County Board of Review.

Eligibility of Emanuel
On January 24, 2011, Rahm Emanuel was removed from the ballot by the Illinois First District Appellate Court in a 2–1 decision. Emanuel's eligibility had been previously confirmed by the Chicago Board of Election Commissioners and a judge of Cook County. Emanuel appealed the case to the Supreme Court of Illinois. Chicago Tribune and Chicago Sun-Times criticized the ruling in editorials as "startling arrogance and audaciously twisted reasoning" and "pinched interpretation of the law [that] ignores the lawmakers' obvious intent".  On January 25, 2011, the Supreme Court of Illinois issued a stay of the appellate court's ruling that Rahm Emanuel should be removed from the ballot.  On January 27, 2011, the Supreme Court of Illinois, in a unanimous (7–0) decision, overturned the ruling of the Appellate Court and allowed Emanuel to stay on the ballot.

Campaign

On September 23, 2010, Miguel del Valle became the first candidate to launch a television commercial in the mayoral race.

Rahm Emanuel announced his resignation as White House Chief of Staff on October 1, 2010, and went on to announce his mayoral candidacy on October 3. According to the Chicago Sun-Times, two Chicago election lawyers stated that Illinois municipal code requires mayoral candidates to reside in the town for a year before the election, making Emanuel ineligible to hold the office.
On December 23, 2010, the Chicago Board of Election Commissioners unanimously rejected the challenge to Emanuel and ruled that he was a legal resident of Chicago.

The editorial pages of Chicago Tribune and Chicago Sun-Times endorsed Rahm Emanuel on February 4, 2011.

While President Barack Obama had not formally endorsed Emanuel, there was a public perception that the president favored his former Chief of Staff for mayor.

Endorsements

Polling
First round

Hypothetical runoff

Results

 Results by ward 

See also
 Mayor of Chicago

References

External links

Candidate list from Chicago Board of Election Commissioners
Chicago Mayor at OurCampaigns.com
The Race for Chicago Mayor at the Chicago Tribune, with Mayoral Scorecard of candidate status
Politics at the Chicago Sun-TimesMeet the Candidates at Chicago TonightMayoral Election at ChicagoNow''
Hearing schedule for objections from Chicago Board of Election Commissioners
Maksym v. Board of Election Commissioners of Chicago – Supreme Court of Illinois (January 27, 2011)

Official campaign websites

Gery Chico For Mayor
Del Valle For Mayor
Del Chicago Mayor
Chicago for Rahm Emanuel
Carol Moseley Braun for Chicago
Patricia Van Pelt-Watkins for Chicago Mayor
Walls for Mayor

2011
2011 Illinois elections
Chicago
2010s in Chicago
2011 in Illinois
Rahm Emanuel